Fissurella barbouri is a species of small sea snail or true limpet, a marine gastropod mollusk in the family Fissurellidae, the keyhole limpets.

References

Fissurellidae
Gastropods described in 1943